Auld Reekie Roller Derby (ARRD) is a women's flat track roller derby league based in Edinburgh, Scotland. Founded in 2008, ARRD was the first Scottish Women's Flat Track Derby Association (WFTDA) member. The league aims to create teams with the ability to compete locally and internationally at the highest levels.

ARRD play by the rules of the WFTDA, and were officially accepted as an Apprentice League on 5 October 2010. The league graduated as full members of the WFTDA on 1 September 2011.

History

Formed in April 2008 as Auld Reekie Roller Girls, ARRD were Edinburgh's first women's flat track roller derby league, and take their name after the city of Edinburgh, affectionately known as "Auld Reekie" ("Old Smoky" in the Scots language). Within two months of forming there was local media interest.

ARRD organise and skate in numerous games and tournaments, both "closed" (for development purposes) and "open" public games. ARRD hosted their first public game, entitled "Fishnet Burns Night", at Meadowbank Sports Centre on 24 January 2009 just ten months after their formation, and competed in the London Rollergirls-hosted European tournament "Roll Britannia" in 2009, placing fourth.

ARRD have an international standing, having travelled to Berlin to take part in the first European Organisational Roller Derby Conference in November 2012, and to Philadelphia, USA, to compete in the East Coast Derby Extravaganza in June 2013. More recently, in May 2016, ARRD travelled to Eugene, Oregon to take part in the 2016 The Big O tournament, hosted by Emerald City Roller Girls. ARRD played teams including Windy City Rollers, Sac City Rollers and Santa Cruz Derby Girls.

Until its closure in 2017, home games were played at the Meadowbank Stadium, which had capacity for up to 400 spectators. Home games are currently played at Dalkeith Community Campus, in Dalkeith, Midlothian. The sport of roller derby is still growing in Scotland, with ARRD running a "Protostars" new skaters programme that is open to anyone who wishes to learn how to play or officiate roller derby.

Current members of ARRD were selected to represent Team Scotland at both the 2011 Roller Derby World Cup, in Toronto, Canada, the 2014 Roller Derby World Cup in Dallas, Texas, and the 2018 Roller Derby World Cup in Manchester, United Kingdom.

In October 2018, Auld Reekie announced a rebrand as "Auld Reekie Roller Derby", to better acknowledge the diversity of its membership.

Teams

Travel Teams
 All Stars (formerly Twisted Thistles)
 All Star Reserves (formerly Cannon Belles)
 All Star Rookies

Home Teams
Intra-league teams were previously selected on a game-by-game basis under the names The Highland Heathens and Celtic Chaos.  In 2012, three permanent home teams were formed and the annual Home Season tournament was launched.
 The Cherry Bombers
 The Skatefast Club (2014 winners)
 The Leithal Weapons (2012, 2013, 2015 winners)

The last Home Season took place in 2015 and Home Teams were subsequently disbanded.

WFTDA competition
Ranked at 57th overall in June 2016, ARRD qualified for WFTDA Division 2 Playoffs in 2016 (their first time qualifying), but declined their spot citing the inability to get a full complement of skaters available for the Playoffs and electing to sit it out. ARRD again qualified for the Division 2 Playoffs and Championship in 2017 as the top seed in Pittsburgh, but was upset by #16 seed Dublin Roller Derby in their first game 200–183, and also lost their consolation round game to Oklahoma Victory Dolls 251–131 to finish out of the medals.

Rankings

 CR = consolation round

Results of Public Bouts

In addition to the public bouts shown below, the team has also undertaken a series of 'closed' (or private) bouts, details of which have not been included.

NB:  indicate a win, whilst  indicates a loss.

All Stars (formerly The Twisted Thistles)

All Star Reserves (formerly The Cannon Belles)

References

Sports teams in Edinburgh
Roller derby leagues established in 2008
Women's Flat Track Derby Association Division 2
Roller derby in Scotland
Women's sports teams in Scotland
Roller derby leagues in Scotland
2008 establishments in Scotland